Hurley Glacier is a glacier between Mount Gaudry and Mount Liotard, flowing east into Ryder Bay, Adelaide Island, Antarctica. It was named by the UK Antarctic Place-Names Committee in 1977 after Alec J. Hurley, a British Antarctic Survey mechanic at Halley Station, 1975–76, and Rothera Station, 1976–77.

See also
 List of glaciers in the Antarctic
 Glaciology

References

 

Glaciers of Adelaide Island